Sweet Oak Branch is a stream in Knox County in the U.S. state of Missouri.

Sweet Oak Branch was named for the sweet oak timber near its course.

See also
List of rivers of Missouri

References

Rivers of Knox County, Missouri
Rivers of Missouri